Willpower or will power may refer to:

Common usage
 Self-control, training and control of oneself and one's conduct, usually for personal improvement
 Volition (psychology), the process of making and acting on decisions
 Will (philosophy), a philosophical concept
 Will to power, a philosophical concept by Friedrich Nietzsche

People

 Will Power (born 1981), an Australian racing driver
 Will Power (performer)

Culture
 Willpower: Rediscovering the Greatest Human Strength, a book by psychologist Roy F. Baumeister
 Will Power (TV series), TVB Drama, 2013

Music
 WLPWR, a band from South Carolina

Albums
 Willpower (Today Is the Day album), 1994
 #willpower (will.i.am album), 2013

Other uses
 Willpower paradox

See also

 
 
 
 
 William Power (disambiguation)
 Will Power (disambiguation)
 Power (disambiguation)
 Will (disambiguation)